Heike Holstein (born 10 December 1971) is an Irish equestrian. She competed at the 1996 Summer Olympics, the 2000 Summer Olympics, the 2004 Summer Olympics and the 2020 Summer Olympics.

In 2019 the Irish dressage team qualified for the first time in history a team for the Olympic Games. Due the postponement of the Olympic Games, some of the Irish team members fell out and the Irish Equestrian Federation decided not to send a team to Tokyo. Now, Holstein will represent Ireland individually at the 2020 Olympic Games for the fourth time in her career. She will compete aboard the home-bred mare Sambuca.

Heike's family is closely involved in the equestrian sport. Her mother Gisela Holstein is a horse trainer and an international dressage judge. Her brother Erik Holstein competed in showing and rein classes. Heike herself was a pupil of Reiner Klimke.

References

External links
 
 

1971 births
Living people
Irish female equestrians
Irish dressage riders
Olympic equestrians of Ireland
Equestrians at the 1996 Summer Olympics
Equestrians at the 2000 Summer Olympics
Equestrians at the 2004 Summer Olympics
Equestrians at the 2020 Summer Olympics
Sportspeople from Dublin (city)
21st-century Irish women